The Imperial is the only studio album by American hip hop group Flipmode Squad. It was released on September 1, 1998 via Elektra Records. Recording sessions took place at Soundtrack Studios in New York. Production was handled by DJ Scratch, Busta Rhymes, Da Beatminerz, L.E.S., M.D., Rockwilder, Swizz Beatz and Tony Touch. It features guest appearance from Buckshot on the sequel track of off Enta da Stage.

The album peaked at number 15 on the Billboard 200 and number 3 on the Top R&B/Hip-Hop Albums in the United States, and at number 85 on the UK Albums Chart. Its single "Cha Cha Cha" made it to #61 on the US Hot R&B/Hip-Hop Songs and #54 on the UK Singles Chart. Music videos were directed for "Everybody on the Line Outside" and "Cha Cha Cha".

Track listing

Personnel
Flipmode Squad

Trevor "Busta Rhymes" Smith – performer (tracks: 2–5, 7-14, 16), producer (track 8), arranging (tracks: 2-16), executive producer
William "Spliff Star" Lewis – performer (tracks: 2–5, 8-16)
Roger "Rampage" McNair – performer (tracks: 2–7, 9-12, 14, 16)
Rashia "Rah Digga" Fisher – performer (tracks: 2–6, 9-14, 16)
Leroy "Baby Sham" Jones – performer (tracks: 2–5, 9-11, 13–16)
Wayne "Lord Have Mercy" Notise – performer (tracks: 4, 7, 9-11, 14)

Technical

Kenyatta "Buckshot" Blake – performer (track 10)
George "DJ Scratch" Spivey – producer (tracks: 2, 5–7, 9, 12, 13, 15), arranging (tracks: 2, 5, 6, 9, 12, 13), executive producer
Douglas "M.D." Brinson – producer (track 3)
Kasseem "Swizz Beatz" Dean – producer (track 4)
Walter "Mr. Walt" Dewgarde – producer & arranging (track 10)
Joseph "Tony Touch" Hernandez – producer (track 11)
Dana "Rockwilder" Stinson – producer (track 14)
Leshan "L.E.S." Lewis – producer (track 16)
Vinnie Nicoletti – recording (tracks: 2–5, 7-13, 15, 16), mixing (tracks: 2, 3, 5–9, 12–14, 16)
Robert Burnette – recording (tracks: 4, 6, 7, 14), mixing (track 11)
Andre DeBourg – recording (track 7)
Dominick Barbera – mixing (tracks: 4, 10, 15)
Eduardo Larez – assistant engineering (tracks: 2, 7, 9, 11), assistant recording (tracks: 4, 5, 10, 12, 13, 15, 16), assistant mixing (tracks: 4, 7, 11, 12)
Rich Tapper – assistant engineering (tracks: 3, 10), assistant mixing (tracks: 2, 5, 6, 8, 9, 13, 14, 16)
Jin Won Lee – assistant engineering (track 3), assistant recording (tracks: 5, 14), assistant mixing (track 15)
Cathy Rich – assistant engineering (track 6)
Sheldon Guide – assistant engineering (track 9), assistant recording (track 4)
Tom Passetti – assistant recording (track 8)
Darren Rapp – assistant recording (track 14)
Tom Coyne – mastering
Rick Posada – executive producer
Gregory Burke – art direction, design
Alli Burke – art direction
Amy Guip – photography
Kevin "Webb" Welch – A&R direction, management
Lisa Aird – A&R coordination
Chris Lighty – management
Mona Scott – management

Charts

References

External links

1998 albums
Rah Digga albums
Busta Rhymes albums
Elektra Records albums
Rampage (rapper) albums
Albums produced by DJ Scratch
Albums produced by Rockwilder
Albums produced by Swizz Beatz
Albums produced by Da Beatminerz
Albums produced by L.E.S. (record producer)